Giovanni Esposito (born 9 February 1998) is an Italian judoka.

He is the silver medallist of the 2021 Judo Grand Slam Tel Aviv in the -73 kg category.

References

External links
 
 
 

1998 births
Living people
Italian male judoka
European Games competitors for Italy
Judoka at the 2019 European Games
20th-century Italian people
21st-century Italian people